The 1990 Norwegian Football Cup was the 85th edition of the Norwegian Football Cup. The final took place at Ullevaal Stadion in Oslo on 21 October 1990. Rosenborg were won the Norwegian Cup after they defeated Fyllingen with the score 5–1. This was Rosenborg's fifth Norwegian Cup title.

Calendar
Below are the dates for each round as given by the official schedule:

First round

|colspan="3" style="background-color:#97DEFF"|21 May 1990

|-
|colspan="3" style="background-color:#97DEFF"|22 May 1990

|-
|colspan="3" style="background-color:#97DEFF"|23 May 1990

|-
|colspan="3" style="background-color:#97DEFF"|24 May 1990

|-
|colspan="3" style="background-color:#97DEFF"|30 May 1990

|}

Second round

|colspan="3" style="background-color:#97DEFF"|30 May 1990

|-
|colspan="3" style="background-color:#97DEFF"|31 May 1990

|-
|colspan="3" style="background-color:#97DEFF"|6 June 1990

|}

Third round

|colspan="3" style="background-color:#97DEFF"|1 July 1990

|}

Fourth round

|colspan="3" style="background-color:#97DEFF"|25 July 1990

|-
|colspan="3" style="background-color:#97DEFF"|Replay: 8 August 1990

|}

Quarter-finals

|colspan="3" style="background-color:#97DEFF"|15 August 1990

|}

Semi-finals

|colspan="3" style="background-color:#97DEFF"|15 September 1990

|-
|colspan="3" style="background-color:#97DEFF"|16 September 1990

|}

Final

References 
Rosenborg's website

External links 
http://www.rsssf.no

Norwegian Football Cup seasons
Norway
Football Cup